Papyrus Oxyrhynchus 224 (P. Oxy. 224 or P. Oxy. II 224) is a fragment of the Phoenissae (lines 1017-1043, 1064-1071), a tragedy of Euripides, written in Greek. It was discovered in Oxyrhynchus. The manuscript was written on papyrus in the form of a roll. It is dated to the third century. Currently it is housed in the British Library (Department of Manuscripts, 783) in London.

Description 
The document was written by an unknown copyist. The measurements of the fragment are 235 by 215 mm. The text is written in a large, heavy, formal uncial hand. The handwriting is similar to the biblical great uncials. There are stops and a few accents.

It was discovered by Grenfell and Hunt in 1897 in Oxyrhynchus. The text was published by Grenfell and Hunt in 1899.

See also 
 Oxyrhynchus Papyri
 Papyrus Oxyrhynchus 223
 Papyrus Oxyrhynchus 225

References 

224
3rd-century manuscripts
British Library collections
Euripides